Christopher James Kreider (born April 30, 1991) is an American professional ice hockey winger and alternate captain for the New York Rangers of the National Hockey League (NHL). Raised in the Charlestown neighborhood of Boston, Kreider previously played college ice hockey at Boston College. He was drafted in the first round, 19th overall, by the Rangers in the 2009 NHL Entry Draft and is the longest-tenured player in the organization. Due to his size and ability to set screens on goaltenders, he is known as "The Human Eclipse." He holds the NHL record for most Stanley Cup playoff goals before playing his first NHL regular season game, with five. In 2022, he became the fourth New York Ranger to score 50 goals in a single season.

Playing career

Amateur
Kreider played for Masconomet Regional High School, and later Phillips Academy, a preparatory school in Andover, Massachusetts. Kreider scored a goal in the 2010 NCAA title game in which Boston College defeated the University of Wisconsin to win the national title; he was also named to the 2010 Hockey East All-Rookie Team.

Kreider was named Most Valuable Player of the 2011 Beanpot Tournament, as Boston College won the tournament for the second-straight time. He was also selected to the senior United States national team to compete in the 2011 IIHF World Championship in Slovakia.

In the 2011–12 season Kreider won a second NCAA title with Boston College, where he led the team in scoring with 23 goals and 45 points in 44 games. His 23 goals were second overall in the Hockey East conference and tied for eighth in the NCAA; his 45 points were fifth in Hockey East and tied for 19th in the NCAA. Kreider was also tied for the Hockey East lead in game-winning goals (5), short handed goals (3) and short-handed points (5). He also finished in the top ten in Hockey East with seven power play goals and 17 power play points.

Professional
On April 10, 2012, Kreider signed a three-year, entry-level contract with the Rangers. He joined New York the following day for practice, and was declared eligible to participate in the 2012 Stanley Cup playoffs. He made his NHL debut a few days later in a Game 3 of the Eastern Conference Quarter-finals on April 16, 2012. He scored his first career NHL goal in Game 6 of that series on April 23 with an assist from former World Junior Championship teammate Derek Stepan, which proved to be the game-winner.

Kreider's second NHL goal was also a playoff game-winning goal, this time coming against the Washington Capitals on in Game 1 of the Eastern Conference Semi-finals on April 28, making him the first player in NHL history whose first two goals were playoff game-winners. He ended the 2012 playoffs with five goals, an NHL record for most playoff goals before playing his first regular season game. The prior record of four such goals was held by Eddie Mazur, and the prior record of three goals in a single post-season prior to playing a regular season game was held by George McPhee and Ray Cote.
Kreider scored his first career hat-trick on November 30, 2013, against the Vancouver Canucks in a 5–2 Rangers victory.

On May 17, 2014, in game one of the Eastern Conference Finals against the Montreal Canadiens, Kreider crashed the net of Canadiens goaltender Carey Price resulting in Price sustaining a sprained knee.  Price would miss the remainder the round of the playoffs.  The Rangers would go on to claim a 4–2 series victory.

On July 23, 2014, Kreider and the Rangers agreed to a two-year, $4.95 million contract extension.

On October 28, 2014, in a game against the Minnesota Wild, Kreider received a major penalty and a game misconduct for dangerously checking Wild defenseman Jonas Brodin from behind into the boards. Despite an injury to Brodin, Kreider was not suspended for the hit.

On July 22, 2016, Kreider signed a four-year, $18.5 million contract extension with the Rangers, avoiding arbitration. Kreider would then have a solid 2016-17 season, setting new career highs in both goals (28) and points (53).

During a game against the Washington Capitals on December 27, 2017, Kreider left the game for an undisclosed reason. It was later revealed that Kreider had a blood clot in his right arm, and would be out indefinitely. On January 8, 2018, it was announced that Kreider would undergo rib resection surgery, and would be out of the lineup for about 5–7 weeks. Kreider played his first game back on February 24, 2018 against the Minnesota Wild after missing 24 games.

On February 24, 2020, Kreider signed a seven-year, $45.5 million contract extension with the Rangers.

On February 1, 2021, Kreider scored his 161st NHL career goal during a game against the Pittsburgh Penguins, passing fellow Ranger Cecil Dillon on the all-time franchise list. He became the second American-born player on the Rangers' all-time goal-scoring list behind Brian Leetch.

In January 2022, Kreider was chosen to the 2022 NHL All-Star Game, which was held at T-Mobile Arena in Paradise, Nevada. It turned out to be a career year for Kreider. On April 5, during a game against the New Jersey Devils, Kreider recorded his 25th power play goal, the most in a single season in Rangers history, breaking the team's record previously held by Jaromír Jágr (24), Vic Hadfield (23), Marcel Dionne and Mike Gartner both with 22 goals. Also, in the same game, he scored his 10th game-winning goal, a new franchise record, beating the Devils 3–1. On April 11, during a game against the Carolina Hurricanes, Kreider scored his 50th goal for the season. He became the fourth player in Rangers franchise history to score 50-plus goals in a single season, joining Jaromír Jágr (54), Adam Graves (52), and Vic Hadfield (50). On April 26th, Kreider was named the recipient of the Steven MacDonald Extra Effort Award. On April 27th, Kreider was named the recipient of the inaugural Mr. Ranger Award presented in memory of Rod Gilbert. 

During Game 6 of the Stanley Cup playoffs against the Pittsburgh Penguins on May 13, Kreider scored his 8th career game-winning playoff goal, setting a new franchise record. After scoring a goal in Game 7, Kreider tied Mark Messier with the second most playoff goals in Rangers history with 29, moving one past Ron Duguay, Adam Graves, and Brian Leetch. In Round 2 of the playoffs during Game 7 against the Carolina Hurricanes, Kreider scored his 15th goal in his 26th career playoff game. He has 15 goals when facing elimination in the playoffs, the most in Rangers franchise history.

International play

Kreider scored six goals for the gold medal-winning United States World Junior Championship team in 2010. He was chosen to represent the United States once again at the 2011 World Junior Ice Hockey Championships, and led the team with four goals in six games as Team USA won the bronze medal. Two of his goals were scored in the bronze medal game, and he was named the USA's best player for that game. Kreider's ten goals in World Junior Championship play tied him with John LeClair and Mike Modano for third all-time among American players, behind just Jeremy Roenick's 13 and Brian Gionta's 11.

In 2018, Kreider, along with teammate Neal Pionk, were the only Rangers players selected to represent the United States at the 2018 IIHF World Championship. He posted 10 points through 10 games, helping the United States claim the Bronze Medal in Denmark.

On April 19, 2019, Kreider was selected to represent Team USA at the 2019 IIHF World Championship, held in Bratislava and Kosice, Slovakia.

Personal Life 
Kreider has a degree in communications from Boston College. Kreider speaks both Spanish and Russian.

Career statistics

Regular season and playoffs

International

Awards and honors

References

External links
 

1991 births
Living people
American men's ice hockey left wingers
Boston College Eagles men's ice hockey players
Connecticut Whale (AHL) players
Hartford Wolf Pack players
Ice hockey players from Massachusetts
National Hockey League first-round draft picks
New York Rangers draft picks
New York Rangers players
People from Boxford, Massachusetts
Phillips Academy alumni
Masconomet Regional High School alumni
Sportspeople from Essex County, Massachusetts